Siv Holma (27 August 1952 – 24 October 2016) was a Swedish politician (Left Party), and former member of the Riksdag serving from 1998 to 2014. She was a Tornedalian.

References

External links
Siv Holma at the Riksdag website

1952 births
2016 deaths
21st-century Swedish women politicians
Deaths from cancer in Sweden
Members of the Riksdag 1998–2002
Members of the Riksdag 2002–2006
Members of the Riksdag 2006–2010
Members of the Riksdag 2010–2014
Members of the Riksdag from the Left Party (Sweden)
Tornedalians
Women members of the Riksdag